Best's Covered Bridge (aka Swallow's Bridge) is a historic covered bridge in West Windsor, Vermont, that carries Churchill Road over Mill Creek, just south of Vermont Route 44. Built in 1889, it is an architecturally distinctive laminated arch structure with a post-and-beam superstructure. It was listed on the National Register of Historic Places in 1973.

Description and history
It rests on stone abutments. The arch is formed out of five layers of planking that have been laminated and bolted together. The floor stringers are supported by iron suspension rods descending from the arches, which are complemented by wooden posts rising above the arches. The arches are protected by a post-and-beam frame structure, its exterior clad in vertical boarding, with a metal roof overhead.

The bridge was built in 1889 by Stephen F. Hammond (1836–1913), a local wheelwright from Brownsville. Some sources state that Amasa W. Swallow (1829–1894) built the bridge, an error that may have originated in a misreading of the 1889 town report. Documentary evidence suggests that the notation, "new covered bridge by Amasa W. Swallow," is actually a reference to the bridge's location.

The bridge's names come from Amasa W. Swallow, who owned the adjacent farm in the 1880s, and William Edgar Best (1869–1971), who in 1896, two years after Swallow's death, purchased the property.

The laminated arch construction is unusual for 19th-century bridges in Vermont, but is well suited for use on a short crossing on a lightly traveled road.

See also 

Other covered bridges in Windsor County, Vermont
Bowers Covered Bridge
Lincoln Covered Bridge
Martin's Mill Covered Bridge (Hartland, Vermont)
Taftsville Covered Bridge
Willard Covered Bridge

Other covered bridges in nearby Cornish
Blow-Me-Down Covered Bridge, built by James Tasker
Blacksmith Shop Covered Bridge, now only foot traffic, built by James Tasker
Dingleton Hill Covered Bridge, built by James Tasker
Cornish-Windsor Covered Bridge, built by James Tasker

Other bridges elsewhere
List of bridges documented by the Historic American Engineering Record in Vermont
List of crossings of the Connecticut River
List of New Hampshire covered bridges
List of covered bridges in Vermont
Old Blenheim Bridge – previous claim of longest single covered span
Bridgeport Covered Bridge – another claim of longest single covered span
Hartland Bridge – The longest covered bridge in the world (located in Hartland, New Brunswick, Canada)
List of bridges on the National Register of Historic Places in New Hampshire
List of bridges on the National Register of Historic Places in Vermont

National Register listings of area bridges
National Register of Historic Places listings in Sullivan County, New Hampshire
National Register of Historic Places listings in Windsor County, Vermont

References

External links

Covered bridges on the National Register of Historic Places in Vermont
Historic American Engineering Record in Vermont
National Register of Historic Places in Windsor County, Vermont
Buildings and structures in West Windsor, Vermont
Road bridges on the National Register of Historic Places in Vermont
Covered bridges in Windsor County, Vermont
Wooden bridges in Vermont
1899 establishments in Vermont
Bridges completed in 1899